The Florida version of the NWA Southern Heavyweight Championship was the major singles professional wrestling championship in the National Wrestling Alliance's Florida territory, Championship Wrestling Florida. It existed from 1962 until 1987, when the title was abandoned. It was revived by NWA Florida in 1996. At various times, different NWA affiliated promotions used their own regional version of the title including promotions based in Georgia, Tennessee, and the Carolinas.

Title history

See also
List of National Wrestling Alliance championships
NWA Southern Heavyweight Championship (Georgia version)
NWA Southern Heavyweight Championship (Tennessee version)

Footnotes

References

Championship Wrestling from Florida championships
National Wrestling Alliance championships
Heavyweight wrestling championships
Regional professional wrestling championships
Professional wrestling in Florida